David Bell (24 December 1909 – 16 April 1986) was a Scottish professional footballer. He was born in Gorebridge. During his career he made over 150 appearances for Ipswich Town.

References

External links 

Dave Bell at Pride of Anglia

1909 births
1986 deaths
Association football fullbacks
Newcastle United F.C. players
Ipswich Town F.C. players
Derby County F.C. players
Scottish footballers
Sportspeople from Midlothian
English Football League players